Oldřich Blecha was a Czech international table tennis player.

Table tennis career
He won two silver medals at the 1933 and 1934 World Table Tennis Championships in the Swaythling Cup (men's team event).

See also
 World Table Tennis Championships
 List of table tennis players
 List of World Table Tennis Championships medalists

References

Czechoslovak table tennis players
World Table Tennis Championships medalists
Possibly living people
Year of birth missing